Hypophthalmus oremaculatus, is a species of demersal catfish of the family Pimelodidae that is native to Paraná River basin of Argentina and Brazil.

References

External links
Holotype-based validation, redescription and continental-scale range extension of the South American catfish species Hypophthalmus oremaculatus Nani and Fuster, 1947, with additional information on Hypophthalmus edentatus Spix and Agassiz, 1829 (Siluriformes, Pimelodidae)

Pimelodidae
Catfish of South America
Fish described in 1947